Doulting Railway Cutting is a 2.8 hectare geological Site of Special Scientific Interest in Somerset, notified in 1971.

The cutting was made in the 1850s for the East Somerset Railway which still runs steam trains through the cutting today.

It shows rocks of the Middle Jurassic period including both the Inferior Oolite/Great Oolite Junction
and the Bajocian-Bathonian stage boundary.

Sources
 English Nature citation sheet for the site (accessed 7 August 2006)

External links
 English Nature website (SSSI information)

Sites of Special Scientific Interest in Somerset
Sites of Special Scientific Interest notified in 1971
Railway cuttings in the United Kingdom
Rail transport in Somerset
Geology of Somerset